J. F. Webb High School is a high school located in Oxford, North Carolina, USA. It contained one subsidiary school, the J.F. Webb School of Health & Life Sciences, which merged with J. F. Webb in 2020. It was named after J. F. Webb, a superintendent of Granville County Schools during the second half of the 1900s.

Sports
The Sports programs include:
Football (JV and Varsity)
Basketball (Men & Women) (JV and Varsity)
Cheerleading (JV and Varsity)
Baseball (JV and Varsity)
Soccer (Men & Women) (JV and Varsity)
Wrestling
Softball (JV and Varsity)
Tennis (Men & Women)
Cross Country
Track & Field
Lacrosse (JV and Varsity)
Volleyball (JV and Varsity)
Lacrosse (JV and Varsity)

Notable alumni 
 Richard H. Moore, North Carolina State Treasurer 2001–2009
 Driicky Graham, American rapper
 Isaiah Hicks, professional basketball player

References

External links 
 
 Warrior Football

Public high schools in North Carolina
Schools in Granville County, North Carolina